The name Winnipeg Jets has been used for three ice hockey teams, two professional and one amateur:

Winnipeg Jets (WHL), a junior team in the Western Hockey League which used the name from 1967 to 1973.
Winnipeg Jets (1972–96), a professional team in the World Hockey Association and National Hockey League that used the name from 1972 to 1996, and are now known as the Arizona Coyotes.
Winnipeg Jets, a professional team in the National Hockey League that has used the name since June 2011, after being established in 1999 as the Atlanta Thrashers.